Mercenaria stimpsoni is a species of saltwater clam.

The species lives at least 92 years.

References

Veneridae
Bivalves described in 1861